James Martinus "Ding" Schoonmaker (born June 10, 1933, in Pittsburgh, Pennsylvania)  is an American sailor. He won the 1975 Star World Championships together with Jerry Ford. He has also several other podiums from the Star World Championships and Soling World Championships. Schoonmaker was inducted into the National Sailing Hall of Fame in 2018.

References

1933 births
Living people
American male sailors (sport)
Finn class sailors
Flying Dutchman class sailors
Star class sailors
Soling class sailors
US Sailor of the Year
Sportspeople from Miami
Star class world champions
World champions in sailing for the United States